Ashwood may refer to:
Ashwood, Victoria,  a suburb of Melbourne, Australia
Ashwood College, a secondary college in the suburb of Ashwood
Ashwood, Oregon, a ghost town in the United States
Ashwood, Staffordshire, a village in England
Ashwood, South Carolina, a census-designated place in the United States
Ashwood, Tennessee, an unincorporated community in the United States
Ashwood, Texas, an unincorporated community in the United States
Ashwood, Virginia, an unincorporated community in the United States
Ashwood University, an unaccredited institution in Pakistan